St Stanislaus' College is an independent Roman Catholic secondary day and boarding school for boys, located in , in the Central West region of New South Wales, Australia,  west of Sydney. Founded in 1867 and conducted since 1889 by the Congregation of the Mission's priests and brothers. The college is the oldest Catholic boys' boarding school in Australia, and caters for approximately 600 students from Year 7 to Year 12, including approximately 120 boarders. The early history of the college is intertwined with that of the short-lived St Charles' Seminary; both institutions shared the original towered section of building facing Brilliant Street until the latter closed in the late 1800s.

St Stanislaus' College is affiliated with the Association of Heads of Independent Schools of Australia (AHISA), and is a member of the Association of Independent Schools of New South Wales (AISNSW).

St Stanislaus' College exists to give a high school education to boys in such a way that the Christian faith in the Catholic tradition is offered, built up and practised.

College motto 
St Stanislaus' College shares its motto with its older sister, St Vincent's College in Castleknock, Dublin: "" ("We, however, in the name of the Lord"), which comes from Psalm 20:7 (Septuagint numbering 19:7). The text in the psalm is "" ("Some trust in chariots or horses; we, however, [trust] in the Name of the Lord."). However, considering "", it may be more accurately translated as "we, however, will call upon the Name of the Lord".

Patron saints

St Stanislaus
The main patron saint of the college is St Stanislaus Kostka SJ of Poland (1550–68). He walked from Vienna to Rome to join the Jesuit order. En route Kostka stopped at Dilingen in obedience to St Peter Canisius who tested his vocation there. On his seventeenth birthday, Kostka achieved his aim and joined the order. Partly because of the exhaustion from his arduous journey, he died about two months before he turned eighteen.

House patrons
The college has six houses.

The patron of St Vincent's House is St Vincent de Paul (1581–1660), the founder of the Congregation of the Mission, also called the Vincentian order. The charism of St Vincent influences all that the College does in that it is a way of following Christ that has been passed on at the College since 1889. St Vincent also founded the Daughters of Charity and gave his life in service of the poor and is known as the patron saint of charitable societies.

The patron of St Charles' House is St Charles Borromeo (1538–1584) who was the patron of the short-lived seminary which was the sister institution of the College in the early years. There is a statue of him on the old part of the College grounds. He was Cardinal Archbishop of Milan from 1564 to 1584, and a leading figure of the Counter-Reformation, along with Ignatius of Loyola and Philip Neri.

The patron of St Joseph's House is St Joseph, Husband of the Blessed Virgin Mary; the patron of St John's House is St John the Evangelist; the patron of St Justin's House is St Giustino de Jacobis CM, a Vincentian missionary bishop in Ethiopia; and the patron of Xavier's House is St Francis Xavier SJ, a Jesuit missionary

College war-cry and song 

The Ric
The College war-cry is known as "The Ric". The words are:
Stannies, Stannies, one, two, three...
Ric, ric, rickety ric,
, hey!
Hey  hey ,
Hey, hey, hey!
Aussie, aussie-ah,
who are, who are, who are we?
We are, we are SSC!
Where do we come from, yeah, yeah, yeah?
Stannies, Stannies !

The Vincentius
The College Song is the 'Vincentius', a Latin hymn about St Vincent de Paul which includes a rendering of verses 15 and 16 of Psalm 132.

History 
St Stanislaus' College was established in 1867 with 14 boys, near the present St Michael and St John's Cathedral. Tuition occurred until 1873 in part of the Denominational School, which replaced the demolished St Michael's church, and the boarders lived nearby under the care of Michael McGirr; the first President was his cousin, Fr James McGirr. A quote from the Catholic newspaper, The Freeman's Journal, mentions the new College: 

The school came under the control of the Congregation of the Mission in 1889, following the arrival of the Vincentian Fathers and Brothers from Ireland. Their task was to run the College and St Charles' Seminary on the same site. The seminary was founded in 1875 and closed at the end of 1891.

In 1892, the College became a member of the Athletic Association of the Great Public Schools of New South Wales (AAGPS). However, travelling to Sydney for sports was difficult and membership was relinquished some years later.

In 1896, the college received much media attention when it became the site of the first x-ray for medical purposes in Australia. This x-ray was taken by Father Joseph Patrick Slattery on 21 September, and showed the location of gunshot in the shattered hand of an ex-student.

The main oval was opened with a game of cricket on St Patrick's Day 1932, a College team pitted against an Australian XI captained by Alan Kippax and including Don Bradman. The college has mainly played rugby union although rugby league was played for some years in all decades from the 1910s to the 1950s. The First XV won the Waratah Shield in 1974, 1980, 1981 and 1995.

Regarding the present site, the original part of the college's building with its three towers was constructed in stages from 1872 to 1907. Other additions included the Gallagher Wing, completed in 1942; an extension of the Chapel and Marble Hall, completed 1954; the John Hall Wing, completed in 1962; and the Slattery Wing, opened by Prime Minister Robert Menzies in 1965. In 1971 an olympic swimming pool was opened; the Guthrie Library, completed in 1976; the McMahon Wing, opened in 1985 and completing an internal quadrangle; the "Brothers" Industrial Arts Complex, constructed in 1989; and in 2005 a large indoor recreation venue and performing arts centre was built, overlooking No. 1 Oval. In 2011, the Trade Training Centre near the Fitz Oval was completed.

The number of College Houses was increased from four to six in the 1980s.

Echoes from St Stanislaus'
Since the arrival of the Vincentians in 1889, the college's annual publication, Echoes from St Stanislaus' College, has been published nearly every year. There were gaps of several years during World War I and World War II. In 1989 A Century of Echoes was published.

Stanislaus College Old Boys Association 
The Association is a separate legal entity to the college and has a role in organizing reunions and administrating the 'Stannies Old Boys Bursary Fund'. There is a tradition of holding class reunions; the year after finishing Year 12; at five year intervals; or at special anniversaries, usually on decade intervals since finishing Year 12. The Bursary Fund is used to contribute to the cost of annual College fees for boys with good academic potential and personal qualities. The precursor of the Association was the "Sydney Union of St Stanislaus' Old Boys", founded on 22 April 1903.

College chapel

The chapel, part of the original building, was extended in 1954. Due to problems with the ceiling it was renovated in recent years, reopening during 2013.

The main stained-glass window depicts the trinity, angels, and several Mysteries of the Rosary: the Annunciation (including part the greeting of the Angel Gabriel to Mary in Latin, i.e., "Hail Mary full of grace"), the Nativity, the Crucifixion and the Coronation of Mary as Queen of Heaven (including the opening words of the Latin hymn "...", i.e., "Queen of Heaven, rejoice..."). The two side-altars feature two beautiful Hardman & Co. stained-glass windows each. There are two series of stained-glass windows at the sides of the chapel. Towards the front the windows represent the College House patron saints. Behind these are symbolised the Four Evangelists.

Two circular paintings have graced the chapel wall on either side of the main window for many years: St Vincent de Paul to the left, and Saint Patrick to the right.

Leadership

Presidents
The following individuals have served as presidents of St Stanislaus' College:

Heads of College
The following individuals have served as heads of St Stanislaus' College:

Child sexual abuse
During 2007, former priests, chaplains and teachers came under investigation over alleged child sexual abuse that up to 40 boys were allegedly sexually abused at the school from the 1960s through to the early 1990s.

Several people associated with St Stanislaus' College have faced legal proceedings due to alleged sexual abuse: 
Brian Spillane, an ordained priest, was initially charged by police in 2008 with 33 sexual abuse offences, including six counts of sexual intercourse with pupils from St Stanislaus' College. In 2009, he was charged with a further 113 offences. On a separate matter, Spillane was convicted in November 2010 of nine counts of indecent assault against three girls aged between eight and seventeen while he was based in both Bathurst and Sydney, for which he was sentenced to nine years jail in 2012 with a non-parole period of five years. After a court-ordered media blackout was lifted dating from 2013, it was reported in 2016 that Spillane was convicted of assaults on five St Stanislaus' College students after a trial in 2013, that in 2015 he pleaded guilty to assaults on four boys at the school in the late 1980s, and during 2016 Spillane was convicted of attacks on five students between 1974 and 1990. Spillane was sentenced in early 2017 for the latest offending, and is serving a total of 25 years imprisonment with a non-parole period of sixteen and a half years.
Kevin Phillips, also an ordained priest, pleaded guilty to four counts of gross indecency with a child under the age of 18, resulting in concurrent sentences of 9 months under the first three charges, and an additional 9 months for the fourth. 
John Gaven, a Vincentian Brother, was charged with 28 sex offences; and in March 2013 was found guilty on six sexual assault charges against former students.
Along with Spillane, Phillips and Gaven, one other man has been charged with sexual abuse cases related to the school: with five counts of indecent assault and one count of sexual assault.
 Glenn Michael Humphreys, an ordained priest, was found guilty by a District Court jury of sexual assault offences against St Stanislaus' College students during the 1970s and 1980s. Humphreys was sentenced in June 2018 to a minimum custodial term of three and a half years.

Notable alumni

The following individuals have been educated or served as staff members of St Stanislaus' College and St Charles' Seminary. They are listed with the years at College in brackets, where known.

Clergy and Brothers
Dom Richard Hugh Connolly  (1889)a monk of Downside Abbey and a major contributor to Syriac scholarship (1873-1948)
Most Rev Patrick Vincent DwyerBishop of Maitland, 1909–31
Rev Fr Chris Middleton  (1970–75)Rector and Deputy Headmaster, St Ignatius' College Athelstone, Adelaide, 1998–2002; Principal, St Aloysius College, Sydney, 2003–14; Rector, Xavier College, Melbourne, since June 2014 
Most Rev Patrick O'Regan (1976)Bishop of Sale, Archbishop of Adelaide 

Entertainment and the arts
John O'Gradyan author with works including the comic novel They're a Weird Mob
Damien ParerAustralian war photographer
Bill PeachABC television journalist and host of This Day Tonight

Military
Leslie John Roberts JonesRAAF pilot, aeronautical engineer
Ray ParerRAAF pilot, aviator and adventurer

Politics and the law
Francis Clarke Member for Macleay and later the inaugural Member for Cowper
Hon. Wilfred Herbert Augustine Collins LLBFormer Judge of the Supreme Court of New South Wales.
Paddy Cricka politician, solicitor and newspaper proprietor
Jim CurranMember for Castlereagh
J. J. DaltonIrish Nationalist Member of the UK Parliament, 1890–92
Tony Kelly (c. 1970s)Former Minister in the Rees and Keneally governments
William Patrick KellyMember of the Legislative Council of New South Wales 
Greg McGirrMember for Yass, Cootamundra, and later Sydney
James McGirr28th Premier of New South Wales
Richard MeagherSpeaker of the Legislative Assembly and later Member of the Legislative Council of New South Wales (also attended St Aloysius' College)

Public service
Sir Peter Lawler an Australian senior public servant and diplomat
 John Lawler  (19731974)34-year career in law enforcement, including for CEO of the Australian Crime Commission; son of Sir Peter Lawler
Charles St John Mulholland (19161920)geologist and public servant 

Science 
Dr James Fitzpatrick  Australian paediatrician; 2001 Young Australian of the Year
 Leslie J. R. Jonesaeronautical engineer (1886- 1970)
Esmond Venner Keoghmedical scientist, administrator and soldier (1895-1970) 
Pat Moran (19301933)statistician

Sport
 Mick Clifford (19271933)rugby union international player
 Herbert Daly (1899)rugby union international player
 James Grant (19811982)rugby union international player
 Tim Lane (19761977)rugby union international player
 James McLaren (19841990)Scottish dual-code international rugby league and rugby union
Ron Quinton  (19611963) jockey and race horse trainer 
 Marty Roebuck (19771982)rugby union international player
 Peter Toohey (19661971)Australian test cricketer
Jim White (18991903)rugby union international player

Notable past staff members
Rev Fr Maurice Joseph O'Reilly President 1903–15; after his time at St Stanislaus' he became Rector of St John's College, University of Sydney. He was a controversialist, journal editor, poet and an apologist for the Catholic faith (1866-1933)
Rev Fr Joseph Slattery an alumnus of St Charles' Seminary and taught at St Stanislaus'; a Vincentian priest, physicist, radiologist and a pioneer in the field of radiography in Australia

See also 

 List of Catholic schools in New South Wales
 List of boarding schools in Australia
 Catholic education in Australia

References

External links 

 

Boarding schools in New South Wales
Educational institutions established in 1867
Boys' schools in New South Wales
Catholic boarding schools in Australia
Catholic secondary schools in New South Wales
Independent Schools Association (Australia)
Education in Bathurst, New South Wales
1867 establishments in Australia
Vincentian schools